Harrison Jay Goldin (born February 23, 1936) is an American lawyer and former politician.

He was born on February 23, 1936, in the Bronx, New York City. He graduated as Science Valedictorian from the Bronx High School of Science in 1953, and received an A.B. summa cum laude from Princeton University in 1957, and an LL.B. from Yale Law School, where he was articles editor of the Yale Law Journal and was elected to the Order of the Coif. Goldin was a Woodrow Wilson Fellow at the Harvard Graduate School. Just prior to his graduation, Goldin turned down several top Wall Street jobs, and instead chose to work during the Kennedy Administration as an attorney in the U.S. Department of Justice's Office of Civil Rights.

Goldin was a member of the New York State Senate from 1966 to 1973, sitting in the 176th, 177th, 178th, 179th and 180th New York State Legislatures. He was New York City Comptroller from 1974 to 1989. In 1989, he ran in the Democratic primary for Mayor of New York City but was defeated by David Dinkins.

After leaving public office in 1989, he opened Goldin Associates, a financial advisory and turnaround consulting firm. Notable cases have included Drexel Burnham Lambert, Rockefeller Center, Enron and Refco.

He was a founding Chair (now Chair Emeritus) of the Council of Institutional Investors and is a Fellow of the American College of Bankruptcy. Goldin was an Adjunct Professor of Accounting at the Stern Graduate School of Business at New York University and an adjunct professor of law at Cardozo and New York Law Schools. He was also a lecturer in law at Columbia Law School.

Further reading 
Dinkins, David A Mayor's Life: Governing New York's Gorgeous Mosaic, PublicAffairs Books, 2013

References

1936 births
20th-century American lawyers
20th-century American politicians
Harvard University people
Jewish American state legislators in New York (state)
Lawyers from New York City
Living people
Democratic Party New York (state) state senators
New York City Comptrollers
Politicians from the Bronx
Princeton University alumni
The Bronx High School of Science alumni
Yale Law School alumni
21st-century American Jews